The WAC Corporal was the first sounding rocket developed in the United States and the first vehicle to achieve hypersonic speeds. It was an offshoot of the Corporal program, that was started by a partnership between the United States Army Ordnance Corps and the California Institute of Technology (named "ORDCIT") in June 1944 with the ultimate goal of developing a military ballistic missile.

Development History
The California Institute of Technology had been fostering a group of rocket enthusiasts known informally during the 1930s as the "suicide squad", which was financed by the Guggenheim Aeronautical Laboratory (GALCIT) since the mid-1930s. Some of the GALCIT enthusiasts had founded a business to manufacture rocket motors called Aerojet.

During the first years of World War II, GALCIT had pursued the development of both solid and liquid-fueled Jet Assisted Take Off (JATO) boosters to aid aircraft take off performance. As the group had experimented with rockets for several years before the war they were selected by the Army to pursue ballistic rocket development.

The first rocket designed by the group for the Army was designated as XFS10S100-A, also known as the Private, that being the first Army enlisted rank. The second ORDCIT project, which became the Corporal, named for the next Army enlisted rank, was a project originally named XF30L 20,000. This was merged with a requirement of the Rocket R&D Division of the Ordnance Corps for a test vehicle. Frank Joseph Malina of the Jet Propulsion Laboratory (JPL) proposed the development of a liquid-fueled sounding rocket to meet this request, thus providing a practical developmental step towards the ultimate Corporal missile.

The theoretical work setting the stage for the WAC Corporal was established in a 1943 paper "A Review and Preliminary Analysis of Long-Range Rocket Projectiles" by Malina and Hsue-Shen Tsien. Design was started by Frank Malina and Homer Joe Stewart to meet the Signal Corps' request with their study "Considerations of the Feasibility of Developing a 100,000-ft. Altitude Rocket." The final design work was done by a team of persons specializing in particular areas and involved significant efforts to derive performance from theoretical means (a relatively new method for America rocketry). The key persons responsible were M.M. Mills (booster), P.J. Meeks (sounding rocket), W.A. Sandburg and W.B. Barry (launcher and WAC nose), S.J. Goldberg (field tests) and H.J. Stewart (external ballistics) and G, Emmerson (photography).

For propulsion, the 38ALDW-1500 Aerojet liquid-fueled engine was chosen, which had been developed as a JATO system for Navy flying boats. The 38ALDW-1500 was modified for hypergolic propellants, with red fuming nitric acid as the oxidizer and furfuryl alcohol as the fuel. The WAC Corporal was intended to use a booster derived from the Tiny Tim air-to-ground attack rocket to gain sufficient velocity along a launch tower for the Corporal's three tail fins to provide passive stability. Despite the emphasis upon a theoretical approach, it was deemed necessary to empirically prove the Corporal's aerodynamics, especially the three fin configuration, so a solid propellant one-fifth scale model called the Baby WAC was tested from a scaled-down launcher in July 1945. Four Baby WACs were flown.

The design of the WAC Corporal was innovative in that main structure containing the oxidizer, fuel, and pressurizing air tanks was of monocoque design, and that it had only three stabilizing fins, rather than the four that the Army preferred. Since the WAC Corporal was conceived as an atmospheric sounding rocket to be utilized in part near populated locations, it was provided with a parachute recovery system for the rocket itself, along with a separate system for recovering the Signal Corps radiosonde payload.

The production of the WAC Corporal was by Douglas Aircraft Corporation with critical parts supplied by JPL and the engines by Aerojet.

Testing
The WAC Corporal test program began at White Sands Proving Grounds in late September 1945 with a series of booster tests lofting dummy upper stages. These were the first missiles launched at White Sands. They were launched from what became LC-33, which was also the launch site for many other early missiles such as the V-2, Viking and Hermes. These first launches tested not only the booster, but the launcher and firing controls, as well as providing practice for the radar and camera crews. October saw two launches of the WAC Corporal with one-third propellant load followed by six fully-fueled flights.

The missions flown during the WAC Corporal first series were:
2 Booster tests on September 26, 1945
2 Booster tests on September 27, 1945
1 Booster test with  load on September 27, 1945
1 Booster test with dummy WAC Corporal on September 28, 1945
1 WAC Corporal to approximately 235,000 feet on October 12, 1945 
1 WAC Corporal to  due to premature nose release on October 16, 1945
1 WAC Corporal to 235,000 feet with premature nose release on October 19, 1945 
1 WAC Corporal launched with pressurization leak no performance recorded on October 25, 1945
1 WAC Corporal launched at night with nose release failure on October 25, 1945

Radar tracking was difficult, as above  the radar return was too small to be detected, and radiosonde signals were not received. No previous American liquid-fueled rocket had exceeded a tiny fraction of the altitudes the WAC Corporal regularly achieved. It was decided on November 9, 1945, to alter the WAC Corporal design to improve upon it for another series of flights. This redesigned rocket was first deemed "Sergeant" in keeping with the JPL naming scheme but was soon renamed WAC Corporal B. The name "Sergeant" was later used for a solid propellant missile designed for the United States Army at JPL. Design of the WAC Corporal B was initiated in March 1946  with P.J. Meeks as Project Coordinator, and differed significantly in detail while its basic shape remained the same. It was  longer, weighed  less, and contained  less propellant. The designs of the fuel pressurization system and fuel valves were simplified. Larger, lighter fins were supplied, which proved problematic on the first WAC Corporal B flight on December 6, 1946.

The flights during the second series of WAC Corporal flights were:
1 Booster test on May 7, 1946
1 Booster test with test of nose cone separation and parachute recovery on May 20, 1946
2 Booster tests with test of nose cone separation and parachute recovery on May 23, 1946
2 Booster tests with test of nose cone separation and parachute recovery on May 24, 1946
2 Booster test with tests of nose cone separation and parachute recovery on May 26, 1946
1 Booster test with test of nose cone separation and parachute recovery on May 29, 1946
1 Booster test with test of nose cone separation and parachute recovery on December 2, 1946
1 WAC Corporal A on December 3 modified with WAC Corporal B fins resulted in fin separation and reached 
1 first WAC Corporal B lost one fin, unstable reached  with successful recovery December 6, 1946
1 WAC Corporal B reached  recovered slightly damaged December 12, 1946
1 WAC Corporal B reached  telemetry section recovered December 12, 1946
1 WAC Corporal B reached  parachute tangled and failed December 13, 1946
1 Test of Mark I Mod I booster with load February 17, 1947
1 WAC Corporal B reached  with lower velocity than expected February 18, 1947
1 WAC Corporal B reached  parachute failed February 24, 1947
1 WAC Corporal B reached  good recovery March 3, 1947
1 WAC Corporal B reached  parachute broke loose June 12, 1947

The WAC Corporal program was an extremely successful test program. The last 6 WAC Corporal Bs to fly were used in the Bumper program as the second stage atop captured V-2 missiles in early air-light and staging experiments. For Bumper, the WAC Corporal was modified to provide stability in excess of Mach 5 by increasing the number of fins to four and increasing their size. The WAC Corporal had to be modified so that the engine ignition would be initiated by the integrating accelerometer of the V-2 stage just before cutoff of the V-2 engine. The WAC Corporal was spin-stabilized by two solid rockets placed between the oxidizer and fuel tanks. The Bumper/WAC had a payload capacity of 50 pounds and carried a Doppler transmitter/receiver which transmitted the nose cone temperature as well as velocity information. There were 6 Bumper flights from White Sands, the first two carrying solid-fueled dummy WACs. Flight number six had a failure on the V-2. Bumper 7 and 8, the last two flights of the Bumper program, were the first launches from the new Joint Long-Range Proving Ground at Cocoa Beach, Florida, which would later be known as Cape Canaveral.

The WAC/Bumper flights were:
Bu-1 May 15, 1948 Dummy WAC Corporal
Bu-2 August 10, 1948 Dummy WAC Corporal
Bu-3 September 30, 1948
Bu-4 November 1, 1948
Bu-5 February 24, 1949
Bu-6 April 21, 1949 first stage failed
Bu-8 July 24, 1950 at Cape Canaveral pad 3, stage separation error
Bu-7 July 29, 1950 at Cape Canaveral pad 3

Bumper 7's WAC Corporal, the last one ever to fly, achieved Mach 9, the highest speed ever achieved by a projectile in the atmosphere at the time.

Outcome and legacy
The WAC Corporal found itself in direct competition in its designed role, with the V-2 offering much larger payload capabilities that became available in the General Electric-operated Hermes program in April 1946. It was also in competition with the Aerobee, a direct descendant of the Corporal, which was tested in late 1947 and became fully operational in spring 1948. Another competitor was the Neptune sounding rocket, later known as the Viking. All three of these offered better performance than the Corporal's  payload. In terms of pounds to altitude per dollar, the Corporal also lost to the competition: Each WAC Corporal B cost , for $320/lb to apogee, while each V-2 reassembled from captured parts cost around $30,000 ($14/lb), and the Aerobee cost $18,500 ($123/lb).

While the WAC Corporal was soon replaced in its intended role of sounding rocket, its legacy was long-lasting. Its 38ALDW-1500 engine was the direct predecessor of the Nike Ajax's A21AL-2600 and Aerobee's 45AL-2600, and was developed into the AJ10 series, which includes the AJ10-37 engine on the second stage of the world's first purpose-built satellite launch vehicle, Vanguard. Other AJ10 series members include the AJ10-101, which powered the Able upper stage on a variety of launch vehicles, the AJ10-137 Service Propulsion System on the Apollo spacecraft, and the AJ10-190 that acted as the Space Shuttle Orbital Maneuvering System. WAC Corporals are on display at the National Air and Space Museum and in the White Sands Missile Range Museum.

Name
The origin of the acronym "WAC" in WAC Corporal has been claimed to stand for multiple different phrases. Some White Sands historians (Kennedy, DeVorkin, Eckles) have claimed it means "Without Attitude Control". In "Bumper 8: 50th Anniversary of the First Launch on Cape Canaveral, Group Oral History," William Pickering attributed it to "Women's Army Corps".

The earliest public reports of the WAC designation are a series of Aviation Week articles, which seem to support "Women's Army Corps" being the derivation of the acronym. In its March 18, 1946 issue, Aviation Week noted, "[u]nder the amusing security code designation of 'WAC Corporal' the project was initiated in 1944...." In the June 1, 1946 of Aviation Week, an article describes how the WAC Corporal "is launched from a triangular 100 ft. launching tower, and thereafter goes its own merry way," and claims that "[t]hese characteristics suggest some of the reasons for the female appellation of the 'WAC,' the 'Corporal' coming from the fact that some Army rockets are designated by familiar ranks."

Specifications

Overall dimensions WAC Corporal A
Diameter: 
Total length:

Tiny Tim booster
Loaded weight:  
Propellant weight: 
Thrust:  
Duration: 0.6 s
Impulse: 133,000 N·s (30,000 lbf·s)

WAC Corporal sustainer
Empty weight: 
Loaded weight: 
Thrust: 
Duration: 47 s
Impulse: 298,000 N·s (67,000 lbf·s)

Notes

References

External links
Astronautix.com article
Article from Directory of U.S. Military Rockets and Missiles
Article from National Air and Space Museum 

Sounding rockets of the United States
Rockets and missiles
Douglas Aircraft Company